The name Anding has been used for three tropical cyclones in the Philippine Area of Responsibility by PAGASA and its predecessor, the Philippine Weather Bureau, in the Western Pacific Ocean.

 Super Typhoon Carmen (1965) (T6530, 35W, Anding), remained over the open ocean, caused seven Japanese fishing vessels to capsize
 Typhoon Irma (1981) (T8126, 26W, Anding), brought significant damage and flooding to the Philippines
 Typhoon Dot (1993) (T9320, 24W, Anding), traversed the Philippines and then made landfall at Hong Kong

Pacific typhoon set index articles